The third Sirisena cabinet was a short-lived central government of Sri Lanka led by President Maithripala Sirisena during the 2018 constitutional crisis.

Cabinet members
Ministers appointed under article 43(1) of the constitution.

State ministers
Ministers appointed under article 44(1) of the constitution.

Deputy ministers
Ministers appointed under article 45(1) of the constitution.

Notes

References

2018 establishments in Sri Lanka
2018 disestablishments in Sri Lanka
Cabinets established in 2018
Cabinets disestablished in 2018
Cabinet of Sri Lanka
Maithripala Sirisena